Sunrise Mall is a shopping mall located in East Massapequa, New York. The mall opened on August 30, 1973 as the first 2-level shopping mall on Long Island.

History
Opened on August 30, 1973, Sunrise Mall was originally anchored by JCPenney (now closed), Gertz (later Stern's, later Sears, now closed), Macy's, and E. J. Korvette (later Abraham & Straus, then Stern's, then Walmart, now Dick's Sporting Goods, Raymour & Flanigan, and Dave & Buster's). It was remodeled in 1991 and it was acquired by the Westfield Group in 2005. In May 2012, XSport Fitness opened its doors for the first time.

On August 4, 2020, it was announced that the mall would be going back to its original name, Sunrise Mall. On January 4, 2021. Sunrise Mall was purchased by Urban Edge Properties from Unibail-Rodamco-Westfield for $29.7 million.

Closures
Walmart closed its store in the mall on March 6, 2015. On March 17, 2017, it was announced that JCPenney would be closing their store here and liquidation sales were expected to begin on April 17, 2017. However, on April 13, 2017, it was announced that due to more shoppers coming to the store, the liquidation sales began on May 22, 2017 instead of April 17, 2017, and the store closed on July 31, 2017.

On October 1, 2021, it was announced that Sears would be closing on October 3, 2021, due to them being forced out of the building by October 14, 2021. This left Macy's as the only traditional anchor left in the mall.

In February 2022, it was announced that the mall would not be renewing leases for its remaining tenants and let those leases expire, and would be closing permanently after 49 years of operation.

Transportation
Nassau Inter-County Express (NICE) buses that serve the mall are the n19 (Freeport-Sunrise Mall via Merrick Road), n54 (Hempstead-Sunrise Mall via Washington Avenue), n55 (Hempstead-Sunrise Mall via Jerusalem Avenue), n71 (Hempstead-Sunrise Mall via Hempstead Turnpike), and the n80 (Sunrise Mall-Hicksville via Hicksville Road). The n19 and n80 run rush hours only and the n54 does not run on Sundays, while the n55 and n71 run seven days a week.

Two Suffolk County Transit (SCT) buses, the S20 (Sunrise Mall-Babylon) and S33 (Sunrise Mall-Hauppauge), also serve the mall, with the latter running seven days a week.

See also
 Roosevelt Field
 Retail apocalypse
 Dead mall

References

External links
https://www.sunrisemallny.com

Shopping malls in Nassau County, New York
Defunct shopping malls in the United States
Shopping malls established in 1973
Shopping malls in the New York metropolitan area
1973 establishments in New York (state)